An ergonym is a proper name or title of an organization, that reflects its function (for example, business associations, learned institutions, industrial companies, agencies, banks, shops, cultural institutions, sports complexes and stadia). An ergonym is a unit of the linguistic space of a city. 

An ergonym may be an important marker of sociocultural processes, and is one of the mirrors in which history and everyday life are reflected. To study the ergonyms of a place is to paint its linguistic portrait, describing the typical and individual aspects of its onomastic space, and making a snapshot of its everyday life.

Etymology 
The term ergonym was first used in 1978 by the Russian linguist N. V. Podolskaya.

The term is derived . However, ergon can also be translated as 'work' or 'action'.

Definitions 
There are different understandings of the term "ergonym". Some Latvian linguists consider it a proper noun, meaning an association of people (such as an organization, a company, or educational institution) created for a specific purpose.

In Russia, which has a long tradition of studying ergonyms, the term is defined in a similar way, as a proper noun denoting an association of people united by a specific direction and type of activity. Russian linguists define ergonyms as names that indicate the functional sphere of the association formed for the purpose of a certain action.

In German linguistics, the term is used to refer not only to the associations or unions of individuals, but also to names of goods and services (e.g., groceries, clothes and cars), names of works of art, publications, broadcast items, children's toys, and the names of retail outlets such as cafés, shops, and hairdressers.

In Finland, researchers rarely use the term, and prefer "company name", "name in public space" or "commercial name". But for others, the concept of ergonym may be somewhat broader than that of merely a trading name or trademark. In their view, "ergonym" also describes the names of institutions such as schools, theatres, churches, and bureaucratic organizations.

Examples

Formation 

Ergonyms can be formed in different ways. Some linguists propose a classification of formation. This classification includes:
 Affixation, for example,  ("Intermebel Super Pipes").
 Compounding, where an ergonym is formed by a combination of two or more word stems. For example, "КinoRооms", "MissAmor".
 Abbreviation, for example "DHL", "DNS", "V&L".
 Ergonyms can be created with the help of a numerical component such as "Boutique No. 7, est. 1910".
 Ergonyms that have unknown meaning or origin, such as "Bershka", "Oodji", "Kari".

Other linguists propose a different classification that includes:
 Ergonyms formed from adjectives, verbs, participles, numerals, adverbs, particles, interjections. For example, "Rendez-vous", "Déjà vu", "Respect".
 Ergonyms in the form of phrases and sentences. Names of two or more words are more informative and semantically expanded.  For example, "Petit cafe", "C'est la Vie", "Shaping Queen".
 Plays on words. These form the largest class. For example, .
 Ergonyms formed from anthroponyms ("Cleopatra"), toponyms ("Olympus"),  mythonyms, the names of living things, These may be explained by their being easily recognized by many people, by their having many different meanings, and by the implication that their characteristics are transferred to the ergonomical entity.
 Ergonyms formed from obsolete words, jargon or slang. For example, 
 Loanwords. For example, "Angel", "Nota Bene", "Бонжур".

Function 

An ergonym may have functions beside being a proper name. It might also be:
 Informative (the name acts as an extremely informative unit in the speech of each communicant)
 Advertising (the name is intended to attract interest, to encourage the response of a potential client)
 Aesthetic (the name usually evokes a positive association, “sounds beautiful”)
 Memorial (the names often reflect the names of the founders, the names of popular music groups, films, etc.)
 Denoting property protection such as a trademark.

References 

Lexicology